René Djian (born 1 February 1927) is a French middle-distance runner. He competed in the 800 metres at the 1952 Summer Olympics and the 1956 Summer Olympics.

References

1927 births
Living people
Athletes (track and field) at the 1952 Summer Olympics
Athletes (track and field) at the 1956 Summer Olympics
French male middle-distance runners
Olympic athletes of France
Athletes from Paris
Mediterranean Games silver medalists for France
Mediterranean Games medalists in athletics
Athletes (track and field) at the 1955 Mediterranean Games
20th-century French people
21st-century French people